Gugol-e Bozorg (also Romanized as Gūgol-e Bozorg and Gogol-e Bozorg) is a village in Qaravolan Rural District, Loveh District, Galikash County, Golestan Province, Iran. At the 2006 census, its population was 122, in 32 families.

References 

Populated places in Galikash County